Ron Lunn (7 May 1929 – 20 August 1987) was an Australian rules footballer who played for Geelong and Essendon over five seasons in the Victorian Football League (VFL).

His son, Stephen Lunn, was also an Australian rules footballer for Geelong and Footscray.

References

External links

1929 births
1987 deaths
Essendon Football Club players
Geelong Football Club players
Australian rules footballers from Victoria (Australia)